Julien Benneteau and Michaël Llodra were the defending champions, but Llodra decided not to participate.
Benneteau played alongside Jo-Wilfried Tsonga. However, they lost to Robin Haase and Ken Skupski 4–6, 7–6(4), [11-13] in the final.

Seeds

Draw

Draw

External links
 Main Draw

Open 13 - Doubles
2011 Doubles